Silvie Defraoui is a visual artist born in St. Gallen in 1935.

Biography 
Silvie Defraoui spent her childhood in St. Gallen and in Grisons. She first studied painting at the l’école des Beaux-Arts d’Alger and later ceramics at the l’école des Arts décoratifs de Genève. Between 1975 and 1994 she worked together with Chérif Defraoui (Geneva 1932–1994). From 1974 to 1999 she taught at the l'Ecole supérieure d'art visuel de Genève (today the Geneva School of Art and Design), where in 1975 she established together with Chérif Defraoui, the Mixed Media Studio.

Solo exhibitions (selection) 
 1979, Cartographie des contrées à venir, Soares dos Reis National Museum, Porto
 1989, Orient/Occident, Centre d’Art Contemporain Genève / Musée Rath, Geneva.
 1993, Les origines de la description,  Le Magasin - Centre National d'Art Contemporain, Grenoble.
 1996, Bruits de surface, Mamco, Musée d'art moderne et contemporain, Geneva
 2000, Nacht und Tag und Nacht, Helmhaus, Zurich
 2004–2005, Archives du futur, Kunstmuseum St. Gallen; Mamco, Musée d'art moderne et contemporain, Geneva
 2009, Sombras electricas, Centre Culturel Suisse, Paris

Group exhibitions (selection)  
 1976, Venice Biennial
 1979, Photography as art, art as photography II und III, Gesamthochschule Kassel      
 1981, Ils se disent peintres, ils se disent photographes, Musée d’Art Moderne, Paris
 1992, La Fontaine du désir,  documenta IX, Kassel 
 1997, Magie der Zahl, Staatsgalerie Stuttgart
 1998, Freie Sicht aufs Mittelmeer, Kunsthaus, Zurich

Awards 
 2006, Kulturpreis of the City of St. Gallen

Publications 
 Kihm, Christophe; Vögele, Christoph (2014). Silvie Defraoui. Und überdies Projektionen (Archives du futur). Zürich: Edition Fink. p. 96. .
 Bitterli, Konrad, editor (2004). Defraoui : archives du futur 1975 - 2004. Nürnberg: Verlag für Moderne Kunst. p. 248. .

References

Swiss sculptors
Swiss contemporary artists
1935 births
Living people
People from St. Gallen (city)
Swiss women artists